The East Central Conference was an athletic conference from 1947 to 1969 based in Eastern Indiana, considered one of the regional superconferences in the state. The conference began with 12 schools, though had turnover within its first year, mainly having to do with gym issues. 

Pendleton and Greenfield, larger schools, refused to play in Cambridge City's gym, deeming it too small to play in. The conference felt otherwise, and forced the two schools out of the conference. Williamsburg, on the other hand, had the opposite problem; its gym was found to be too small for conference play, and moved them out as well. To fill their spots, the conference recruited Milroy, Morristown, and Morton Memorial to join the fold.  

While the conference did grow to 13 schools, by 1956 it had started to splinter. Three schools left to found the Eastern Indiana Athletic Conference in 1956, while in 1962 four schools left to help found the Tri-Eastern Conference. The formation of the TEC in 1962 almost caused the ECC to fold, as it was left with five members. However, the Hancock County Conference's six schools were merged into the fold, giving the conference new life. However, the conference did not have long, as the formation of the Big Blue River Conference left the conference with three schools by 1968, two of which were scheduled to be closed at the end of the 1968-69 school year. The sole remaining member, Morton Memorial, opted to join the BBRC that next year.

Membership

 Team name was Falcons before 1957.
 Liberty played in both the ECC and WVC from 1947 until it left for the Tri-Eastern Conference in 1962.
 Known as West Side before 1957.
 Team name was Wildcats before 1957.

Boys' Basketball Conference Champions

 Titles from 1948-51, 1957, 1959, 1961-62, 1964-65, 1968-69 are unverified.

References

Indiana high school athletic conferences
High school sports conferences and leagues in the United States
Indiana High School Athletic Association disestablished conferences
1947 establishments in Indiana
1969 disestablishments in Indiana